Ciepielówek  is a village in the administrative district of Gmina Sława, within Wschowa County, Lubusz Voivodeship, in western Poland. 

References

Villages in Wschowa County